The 1964 All-Ireland Senior Football Championship was the 78th staging of the All-Ireland Senior Football Championship, the Gaelic Athletic Association's premier inter-county Gaelic football tournament. The championship began on 26 April 1964 and ended on 27 September 1964.

Dublin entered the championship as the defending champions, however, they were defeated by Meath in the Leinster final.

It was Galway's second consecutive final, having lost to Dublin in the previous year's decider. The Tribesmen won their 5th All-Ireland title, beating Kerry by 5 points in the final, 0-15 to 0-10. It was the start of the most successful era in Galway football, their "Three In A Row".

Leinster Championship format change

In 1964 only 2 Quarter-finals instead of the usual 4 were played in the Leinster football championship. The first round which contained just 2 matches and second round containing 3 matches was introduced the system lasted for just 1 year. It was to improve football in weaker counties.

Results

Connacht Senior Football Championship

Quarter-finals

Semi-finals

Final

Leinster Senior Football Championship

First round

Second round

Quarter-finals

Semi-finals

Final

Munster Senior Football Championship

Quarter-final

Semi-finals

Final

Ulster Senior Football Championship

Preliminary round

Quarter-finals

Semi-finals

Final

All-Ireland Senior Football Championship

Semi-finals

Final

Championship statistics

Miscellaneous

 The Carrick-on-Shannon ground is named after a 1916 rising leader this year as it is named Páirc Seán Mac Diarmada after Seán Mac Diarmada.
 Meath won the Leinster title for the first time since 1954.

Top scorers
Overall

Single game

All-Ireland Senior Football Championship